Takayus wangi is a species of comb-footed spider in the family Theridiidae. It is found in China.

References

Theridiidae
Spiders described in 1998
Spiders of China